James Richard "Jim" Goodman (born July 16, 1944) retired as professor of computer science at the University of Auckland in Auckland, New Zealand, and emeritus professor at the University of Wisconsin–Madison.

Education and research

Goodman received a PhD from the University of California, Berkeley in 1980. He joined the faculty at the University of Wisconsin–Madison the same year as an assistant professor of computer science.

Goodman's research is focused mainly on computer architecture: the hardware/software interface. His current interests are primarily focused on support for Transactional Memory. Goodman's seminal 1983 paper, "Using cache memory to reduce processor-memory traffic", was the first to describe snooping cache coherence protocols and to identify the phenomenon of cache being able to conserve the memory bandwidth.

Goodman is the co-author of A Programmer's View of Computer Architecture , a highly acclaimed book on computer architecture, and co-authored with Andrew Tanenbaum Structured Computer Organization .  In 2007, he was named a Fellow of the IEEE "for contributions to shared-memory multiprocessor system design".  In 2010, he was named a Fellow of the Association for Computing Machinery "for contributions to parallel processor and memory system design."  In 2013, he received the Eckert–Mauchly Award for "breakthroughs in architecture of shared-memory multiprocessors".

Personal

Goodman was born in 1944 in Topeka, Kansas. Because of his expertise in the field of computer science, he has been interviewed several times as an expert on TV shows such as Campbell Live.

References

External links
  James Goodman's page at Auckland
 James Goodman's profile on the IEEE Computer website

1944 births
American computer scientists
Living people
University of Wisconsin–Madison faculty
Academic staff of the University of Auckland
Computer designers
Computer systems researchers
American electrical engineers
People from Topeka, Kansas
Fellows of the Association for Computing Machinery
Fellow Members of the IEEE